Hazelhurst is a historic house located at 150 East Genesee Street in Skaneateles, New York. It was originally a small summer home built for William Loney about 1866, and enlarged and renovated in 1904.  It had an extensive lawn stretching down to Skaneateles Lake, which was later split up into 30 separate building lots that now share a common lake access.  Hazelhurst is a three-story, irregular plan, Queen Anne style balloon frame dwelling.  It features a wraparound porch with Ionic order columns, multiple gabled roof, porte cochere, and corner tower with conical roof.  The mansion is now used as a 14-bedroom home for the elderly called "The Athenaeum".

The building was listed on the National Register of Historic Places in 2010.

See also
National Register of Historic Places listings in Onondaga County, New York

References

External links

Houses on the National Register of Historic Places in New York (state)
Queen Anne architecture in New York (state)
Houses completed in 1904
Houses in Onondaga County, New York
National Register of Historic Places in Onondaga County, New York